Marudi is a district, in Miri Division, Sarawak, Malaysia. Its seat is the town of Marudi.

References